Sternaspis may refer to:
 Sternaspis (polychaete), a genus of polychaetes in the family Sternaspidae
 Sternaspis, a genus of worms in the family Aspidosiphonidae, synonym of Aspidosiphon
 Sternaspis, a genus of beetles in the family Scarabeidae, synonym of Oxysternon